Arvedin Terzić (born 2 April 1989) is a Bosnian footballer who last played in Austria for Floridsdorfer.

Club career
Terzić joined the youth set-up of Rapid Wien in 2006, and he advanced through the club's youth system, making his debut for the second team as a substitute for Christopher Drazan in a 2–0 win against Neusiedl am See in Regional League East on 7 March 2008. Terzić moved to fellow Regional League East side Floridsdorfer in 2010, before stepping up to the First League with FC Lustenau in the summer of 2012. He spent only half a season with Lustenau before being signed by Bundesliga club Wiener Neustadt after registering five goals and six assists in 18 league games.

Terzić made his Bundesliga debut on 23 February 2013 as a substitute in a 0–0 draw against SV Ried. A month after scoring in his first league start against Red Bull Salzburg on 2 March 2013, Terzić ruptured his Achilles tendon early in a game against Sturm Graz, an injury that ruled him out of the rest of the season and the start of the next.

He spent his latest seasons in the Austrian lower leagues.Austrian career stats - ÖFB

References

External links
Vertragsauflösung mit Arvedin Terzic, fac.at, 27 January 2016

1989 births
Living people
People from Zvornik
Association football midfielders
Bosnia and Herzegovina footballers
Floridsdorfer AC players
FC Lustenau players
SC Wiener Neustadt players
Kremser SC players
Austrian Regionalliga players
Austrian Football Bundesliga players
2. Liga (Austria) players
Austrian Landesliga players